Howard Stone may refer to:

 Howard A. Stone, American professor of engineering 
 Howard F. Stone, U.S. Army general